Mani Sharma (born 30 October 1996) is an Indian cricketer. He made his Twenty20 debut on 18 January 2021, for Himachal Pradesh in the 2020–21 Syed Mushtaq Ali Trophy.

References

External links
 

1996 births
Living people
Indian cricketers
Himachal Pradesh cricketers
Place of birth missing (living people)